The Louisiana Intercollegiate Athletic Association (LIAA) was an intercollegiate athletic conference that existed from 1912 to 1925. The conference's members were located in the state of Louisiana.

Members

Champions

 1912 –  Unknown
 1913 –  Unknown
 1914 – Southwestern Louisiana Industrial
 1915 – Southwestern Louisiana Industrial
 1916 – Southwestern Louisiana Industrial

 1917 – Southwestern Louisiana Industrial
 1918 – Unknown
 1919 – Unknown
 1920 – Unknown
 1921 – Louisiana Tech

 1922 – Centenary
 1923 – Centenary
 1924 – Southwestern Louisiana
 1925 – Southwestern Louisiana

See also
List of defunct college football conferences

References

Defunct college sports conferences in the United States
College sports in Louisiana